Domingo Ruíz is a barrio in the municipality of Arecibo, Puerto Rico. Its population in 2010 was 3,153.

History
Puerto Rico was ceded by Spain in the aftermath of the Spanish–American War under the terms of the Treaty of Paris of 1898 and became an unincorporated territory of the United States. In 1899, the United States Department of War conducted a census of Puerto Rico finding that the population of Domingo Ruíz barrio was 931.

Sectors
Barrios (which are like minor civil divisions) in turn are further subdivided into smaller local populated place areas/units called sectores (sectors in English). The types of sectores may vary, from normally sector to urbanización to reparto to barriada to residencial, among others.

The following sectors are in Domingo Ruíz barrio:

, and 
.

See also

 List of communities in Puerto Rico
 List of barrios and sectors of Arecibo, Puerto Rico

References

Barrios of Arecibo, Puerto Rico